Merlo Silva Albano is a former Philippine international footballer and referee.

Early life and education
Born in 1979, Merlo Silva Albano is the fourth child of Loyolo and Mercedes Albano. She graduated from the Holy Cross of Davao College with the bachelor's degree in physical education

Playing career
Albano started playing football as early as 2004. In that year she played for a representative side of Davao in an open tournament in Marikina which gave way for an opportunity to train with the Philippines women's national football team for a month. She then debuted for her country at the 2004 AFF Women's Championship in Vietnam and also played in the 2007 edition of the tournament which was hosted in Myanmar. She played for the national team until 2008 often spending time training in Manila. She decided to retire from the national team due to financial issues and being away from her family in Davao City. She also served as a playing coach for Sakya FC of the Maharlika Sports Development Institute organized She Futsal League.

Officiating career
Affiliated with the Davao-South Regional Football Association of the Philippine Football Federation, Albano became an international referee for FIFA in 2012 and as of 2018 is an assistant referee officiating in women's football matches. She has officiated at the 2022 AFC Women's Asian Cup.

References

1979 births
Living people
Filipino women's footballers
Philippines women's international footballers
Sportspeople from Davao City
Women's association football referees
Women association football referees
Filipino football referees
Women's association footballers not categorized by position